Joseph Richardson House may refer to:

 Joseph Richardson House (Uxbridge, Massachusetts), listed on the National Register of Historic Places (NRHP)
 Joseph Richardson House (Langhorne, Pennsylvania), listed on the NRHP in Bucks County, Pennsylvania

See also
Richardson House (disambiguation)